"Easier to Walk Away" is a song by English musician Elton John, written by John along with Bernie Taupin and released as the second and final single from the Rocket Records 2-CD retrospective The Very Best of Elton John, issued largely in overseas markets excluding the United States, where the more expansive box set To Be Continued... was issued.
The song reached the Top 75 and Top 20 in some countries. A music video was made to promote the song composed of some Elton John music videos from 1978 to 1990 and some stock footage in various decades.

This song tackles about escaping in an infidelity relationship with his wife (which the singer was involved) by finding another place to release his emotions about their relationship peacefully.

Chart performance 
The song peaked at No. 63 in the UK, No. 57 in Australia, No. 59 in Canada, No. 51 in Germany and No. 71 in the Netherlands but it found better success in Austria and France, peaking at No. 23 and No. 20 respectively.

Music video 
The entire music video was shot in black and white. It features John in various activities he was involved like attending the Watford F.C. games and having fun backstage and various historical events in history.

It is also composed of some Elton John music videos from 1978 to 1990 (from how the video started):

 "Healing Hands" (1989) 
 "I Don't Wanna Go on with You Like That" (1988)
 "You Gotta Love Someone" (1990) 
 "Wrap Her Up" (1985) 
 "Paris" (1986) 
 "A Word in Spanish" (1988)
 "Sacrifice" (1989)
 "I Guess That's Why They Call It the Blues" (1983)
 "Ego" (1978)

Personnel
Elton John – vocals and piano 
Randy Jackson – bass
Kenny Aronoff – drums
Paul Jackson, Jr. – guitar
Michael Landau – guitar
David Lasley, Harry Bowens, Donald Ray Michell, Sweet Pea Atkinson – backing vocals
James Newton Howard – synthesizers and arrangements
Michael Mason – Synclavier

Charts

References 

1990 songs
Songs with lyrics by Bernie Taupin
Songs with music by Elton John
Elton John songs
The Rocket Record Company singles